Barn av vår tid is the fourth studio album by Swedish hip hop group Hov1, released on 1 October 2021 by EMI and Universal. It charted atop the national albums chart in Sweden, and has been certified Gold by the Swedish Recording Industry Association.

The album's first three singles reached number-one in Sweden. The title track was released as the first single on 15 January 2021. Its cover, a pastiche of the album art of Kanye West's My Beautiful Dark Twisted Fantasy, features a pixellated photograph of Pernilla Wahlgren from a 2001 Café photoshoot. "Gamora", the second single, features rapper Einár and was released on 5 March 2021; its title comes from the comic book character of the same name. The third single, "Tokken" featuring Dree Low, was released on 7 May 2021. "Hit the Club" was released on 20 August 2021, and reached a peak of number three. In addition, "Räkna dagar" reached number-one upon the album's release.

Critical reception

Barn av vår tid received generally negative reviews from Swedish publications, with criticism aimed towards its shallow lyrics about girls, money and cars.

Track listing

Charts

Weekly charts

Year-end charts

Certifications

See also
 List of number-one singles and albums in Sweden

References

2021 albums
EMI Music Sweden albums
Hip hop albums by Swedish artists
Swedish-language albums
Universal Music AB albums